The Billboard Christmas Hits survey ran each holiday season between 1983 until 1989 except for 1986.  The singles chart only ran a total 6 of weeks between 1983 and 1985.

List of number one Billboard Christmas Hits 1983–1989
These are the Billboard Christmas Hits chart number-one albums and singles from 1983 until 1989.

Billboard Christmas Hits Top 10 Albums

These are the LPs that reached the top 10 on Billboards Christmas Hits album chart from 1983 until 1989 .  The peak position reflects the highest position the album charted between December 17, 1983 until January 6, 1990. The top 10 and total weeks include the weeks charted since the first Christmas Records''' chart in 1958.  The current online chart history of Billboard'' Top Holiday Albums begins with the December 21, 1985 Christmas Hits album chart.

See also
Billboard Best Bets for Christmas 1963-1973
Billboard Christmas Holiday Charts
Billboard Top Christmas Albums of the 1990s

References

Christmas
Record charts